The Concorde TSP Solver is a program for solving the travelling salesman problem. It was written by David Applegate, Robert E. Bixby, Vašek Chvátal, and William J. Cook, in ANSI C, and is freely available for academic use.

Concorde has been applied to problems of gene mapping, protein function prediction, vehicle routing, conversion of bitmap images to continuous line drawings, scheduling ship movements for seismic surveys, and in studying the scaling properties of combinatorial optimization problems.

Notes

References

.
.
.
.
.
.
.

External links
Concorde website
Online access to Concorde solver at Arizona State University

Travelling salesman problem
Mathematical optimization software